Kulja or Gulja may refer to:

 Yining, also known as Kulja or Ghulja, a city in Xinjiang, China
 Ghulja incident, 1997
 Kulja, Estonia, a village
 Kulja, Western Australia, a town
 Gulja noir or Mornen noir, a red French wine grape